The Cockatoo Docks & Engineering Company was a ship building and maintenance company which operated the Cockatoo Island Dockyard on Cockatoo Island in Sydney, Australia between 1933 and 1992.

History

The Cockatoo Docks & Engineering Company commenced trading on 1 March 1933 taking a 21 year lease over the dockyard on Cockatoo Island from the Federal Government.

Having held a minority shareholding since 1937, in 1947 Vickers-Armstrongs became the majority shareholder. In February 1954, the lease was renewed for a further 20 years and 8 months, and again from 1 January 1972 for 21 years.

In February 1984, Vickers merged its Australian interests were with the Commonwealth Steel Company to form Comsteel Vickers, Vickers and BHP each owning 38%, with the remaining 24% held by smaller investors. On 4 June 1986, the company was purchased by Australian National Industries (ANI).

As part of a review of Australia's ship building capabilities, the Federal Government decided in 1987 the lease would not be renewed. Although consideration was given to terminating the lease early, in the end it ran its course until 31 December 1992, although the only work performed in the last 18 months was decommissioning the dockyard. A lengthy legal action over various costs and liabilities between the government and ANI was settled in May 1997.

Ships built

  1933
 Customs patrol vessel Vigilant, later  1938, first aluminium ship built in Australia
  sloops  1935,  1936,  1939,  1940
  destroyers  1940,  1942,  1944
 Net-class boom defence vessel  1938
 Bar-class boom defence vessels  1939,  1940,  1941
 s  1940,  1940,  1941,  1941,  1941,  1942
 A-class cargo steamships River Clarence 1943 and River Hunter 1945
  
  destroyers  1952,  1956
  destroyer escorts  1959,  1961,  1968
  1964
 Destroyer tender  1966
   1984

Other work
In World War II the dockyard was the main ship repair facility in the Pacific Ocean, with more than 250 ships repaired. Many ships of the Royal Australian Navy (RAN) were repaired.

From the early 1960s, the dockyard refitted RAN vessels including s (5), s (14) and s (43).

References

Further reading
 

BHP
Cockatoo Island (New South Wales)
Shipbuilding companies of Australia
Vickers
Australian companies established in 1933
Manufacturing companies established in 1933
Australian companies disestablished in 1992
Manufacturing companies disestablished in 1992